Atropos is a UK-based journal for specialists in Lepidoptera and Odonata. It takes its name from the scientific name of the death's-head hawkmoth, Acherontia atropos.

It was first published in May 1996.

Entomology journals and magazines